The 1992 Manchester Open was the third edition of the Manchester Open tennis tournament and was played on outdoor grass courts. The tournament was part of the ATP World Series and was held from 15 to 22 June.

In singles, Jacco Eltingh won his 5th career title and his only title of the year by defeating MaliVai Washington in the final.

Finals

Singles

 Jacco Eltingh defeated  MaliVai Washington 6–3, 6–4

Doubles

 Patrick Galbraith /  David Macpherson defeated  Jeremy Bates /  Laurie Warder 4–6, 6–3, 6–2

References

External links
 ITF – tournament edition details

 
Manchester
Manchester Open
Manchester Open, 1992
Manchester Open